The 1959–60 Indiana Hoosiers men's basketball team represented Indiana University. Their head coach was Branch McCracken, who was in his 19th year. For the last time, the team played its home games in The Fieldhouse in Bloomington, Indiana, and was a member of the Big Ten Conference.

The Hoosiers finished the regular season with an overall record of 20–4 and a conference record of 11–3, finishing 2nd in the Big Ten Conference. Indiana was not invited to participate in any postseason tournament.

Roster

Schedule/Results

|-
!colspan=8| Regular Season
|-

References

Indiana Hoosiers
Indiana Hoosiers men's basketball seasons
1959 in sports in Indiana
Indiana Hoosiers